Diane Edith Brown  (born 1951) is a novelist and poet from New Zealand.

Background 
Brown was born in 1951. She is based in Dunedin.

Career 
Brown has published several novels and poetry collections including:
 Before The Divorce We Go To Disneyland (1997, Tandem Press), poetry
 Learning to Lie Together (2004, Godwit), poetry
 If The Tongue Fits (1999, Tandem Press), novel
 Eight Stages of Grace (2002, Random House), novel
She is also the author of the memoirs Liars and Lovers (2004), Here Comes Another Vital Moment (2006), and Taking My Mother To The Opera (2015).

Poetry by Brown has appeared in literary journals including Landfall, Poetry New Zealand, and New Zealand Listener.

Brown currently runs the creative writing school, Creative Writing Dunedin.

Awards 
In the 2013 New Year Honours, Brown was appointed a Member of the New Zealand Order of Merit, in recognition of services as a writer and educator.

Before The Divorce We Go To Disneyland won the 1997 NZSA Jessie Mackay Award for Best First Book of Poetry at the Montana New Zealand Book Awards. Eight Stages of Grace was a finalist in the 2003 Montana New Zealand Book Awards.

Brown was the inaugural fellow at the Michael King Writer's Studio. In 1997 she was awarded the Grimshaw Sargeson Fellowship with Shonagh Koea. She was also awarded the 2013 Beatson Fellowship from Creative New Zealand and in 2012 won the NZSA Janet Frame Memorial Award.

References

External links 
 Official homepage
 Creative Writing Dunedin

Living people
1951 births
New Zealand fiction writers
New Zealand women novelists
New Zealand women poets
Members of the New Zealand Order of Merit
Writers from Dunedin
Place of birth missing (living people)